Oscar Nilsson-Julien (born 10 January 2002) is a British road and track cyclist.

Cycling career
Oscar Nilsson-Julien is the 2022 U23 European Omnium Champion, a title won at the UEC U23 European Championships in Anadia. He is also the 2022 Senior British Elite Omnium Champion after winning the event at the 2022 British National Track Championships. In addition he won silver medals in three other events, the points, scratch and madison.

Being an Elite road rider and a member of the Great Britain U23 development programme, he races for their road team, Team Inspired.   

In 2022, he was 3rd in the opening TTT at Kreiz Breizh Elites with further road racing victories at GP Getbeets, Aaarchot GP and Putte GP in Belgium. Results as a junior include 9th in the World Championships Junior Time Trial in Harrogate 2019 and European Champion Junior Team Pursuit in 2019.

Major results

2019
 1st  Team pursuit, UEC European Junior Track Championships
 1st  Scratch, National Junior Track Championships
 2nd Overall Isle of Man Tour
 9th Time trial, UCI Road World Championships
2022
 1st  Omnium, UEC Under-23 European Track Championships
 National Track Championships
1st  Omnium
2nd Points race
2nd Scratch
2nd Madison (with Jack Brough)
 9th Chrono des Nations Under-23

References

External links
 

2002 births
Living people
British male cyclists
British track cyclists
English track cyclists
English male cyclists